João Lima may refer to:

 João Lima (footballer) (born 1996), Portuguese footballer
 João Lima (athlete) (born 1961), Portuguese hurdler
 João Filgueiras Lima (1931–2014), Brazilian architect